Deitz is a surname. Notable people with the surname include:

Alonzo E. Deitz (1836–1921), American lock manufacturer
Doug Deitz (1914–1994), Australian rugby league player
Richard Deitz (born 1965), American hedge fund manager
Robert Deitz (born 1946), American intelligence officer and lawyer
Shane Deitz (born 1975), Australian cricketer
Terry Deitz (born 1959), United States Naval aviator and reality television show contestant
Tom Deitz (1952–2009), American writer

See also
Deitz Farm, a national historic district in West Virginia